Rosalba rufobasalis is a species of beetle in the family Cerambycidae. It was described by Breuning in 1940. It is known from Colombia.

References

Rosalba (beetle)
Beetles described in 1940